Ramalina siliquosa, also known as sea ivory, is a tufted and branched lichen which is widely found on siliceous rocks and stone walls on coastlands round the British Isles, occasionally slightly inland. It grows well above the high-tide mark but is still very tolerant of salt spray. The branches are flattened and grey, and bear disc-like spore-producing bodies. It forms part of the diet of sheep in Shetland and on the coast of North Wales. It is found in Iceland where it has a conservation status of a vulnerable species.

Taxonomy
The species was originally described as Lichen siliquosus by the botanist William Hudson in 1762. It was transferred to the genus Ramalina by Annie Lorrain Smith in 1918.

References

Lichen species
Lichens described in 1762
Lichens of Europe
siliquosa
Taxa named by William Hudson (botanist)